Caours is a commune in the Somme department in Hauts-de-France in northern France.

Geography 

Population

History

Stone-age archaeology 
The fluvial deposits of the Somme around Caours have been well known to archaeologists in the latter part of the 20th  century, are remains of a time when climate was more temperate. The last interglacial, once known under the name of Riss-Würm, was between 130,000 and 115,000 years ago. The area has produced the remains of mammals of this Paleolithic era, notably antlers and bone. A joint research programme by the INRAP and the CNRS in 2005, has produced interesting results about Neandertal man.

The theory that once explained the disappearance of the Neandertals, the inability to adapt to climatic change has suddenly been put into perspective by the site of Caours.

See also 
 Communes of the Somme department

References 

Communes of Somme (department)